Auce Municipality was a municipality in Semigallia, Latvia. The municipality was formed in 2009 by merging Bēne parish, Lielauce parish, Ukri parish, Vītiņi parish, Īle parish and Auce town with its countryside territory the administrative centre being Auce.

On 1 July 2021, Auce Municipality ceased to exist and its territory was merged into Dobele Municipality.

Twin towns — sister cities

Auce was twinned with:
 Akmenė, Lithuania
 Joniškis, Lithuania
 Bryansk, Russia

See also
Administrative divisions of Latvia

References

 
Former municipalities of Latvia